Cindy Meyer (born 21 June 1964) is a South African short track speed skater. She competed in two events at the 1994 Winter Olympics.

References

External links
 

1964 births
Living people
South African female short track speed skaters
Olympic short track speed skaters of South Africa
Short track speed skaters at the 1994 Winter Olympics
People from Boksburg
Sportspeople from Gauteng